Latiaxis mawae is a species of sea snail, a marine gastropod mollusk in the family Muricidae, the murex snails or rock snails.

References

External links

 Kilburn R.N., Marais J.P. & Marais A.P. (2010) Coralliophilinae. pp. 272–292, in: Marais A.P. & Seccombe A.D. (eds), Identification guide to the seashells of South Africa. Volume 1. Groenkloof: Centre for Molluscan Studies. 376 pp.

Latiaxis
Gastropods described in 1984